Edgeworth David Base is a refuge and research outpost named after Sir Edgeworth David, located in Northern Bunger Hills. It was opened in 1986 by the Australian Antarctic Division. It is temporary visited during the summer season and used for geological, geophysical, geomorphological and biological research.

See also
 List of Antarctic research stations
 List of Antarctic field camps

References

Outposts of Antarctica
1986 establishments in Antarctica
Australian Antarctic Territory